The discography of Sigur Rós, an Icelandic post-rock group, consists of seven studio albums, three remix album, five extended plays, one soundtrack album, sixteen singles, twenty-three music videos and two video albums. Sigur Rós was formed in 1994 in Reykjavík, Iceland, by singer and guitarist Jón Þór Birgisson, bassist Georg Hólm and drummer Ágúst Ævar Gunnarsson.

Sigur Rós released their debut album, Von, in 1997 with Smekkleysa Records. It failed to chart, selling 313 copies in its first year of release, but was certified platinum in 2005 by Iceland's record industry association. Von brigði was released in 1998 and features remixes of tracks from Von. Only one track, "Leit af lífi", was new to the album. Keyboardist Kjartan Sveinsson joined the band in 1998 and a year later Ágætis byrjun was released. It reached number 1 on the Icelandic album chart, number 17 in Norway, and number 52 on the United Kingdom Albums Chart. Two tracks were released from the album as singles: "Svefn-g-englar" and "Ný batterí". Gunnarsson left the band after Ágætis byrjun and was replaced by Orri Páll Dýrason.

The group's third studio album,, was released in June 2002, comprising eight untitled tracks divided by a 36-second silence. The album's title consists of two opposing parentheses; it has no other official title, though members of Sigur Rós have referred to it as "Svigaplatan" ("The Bracket Album"). The entire album is performed in Vonlenska, a constructed language. "Vaka"). Takk..., released in 2005, produced three singles, "Glósóli", "Hoppípolla" and "Sæglópur". The album reached number 1 in Iceland, number 4 in Italy and Norway, number 16 in the UK, and number 27 in the United States. It was certified gold in Iceland and the UK. Sigur Rós's fifth studio album, Með suð í eyrum við spilum endalaust, was released in 2008 with "Gobbledigook", "Inní mér syngur vitleysingur" and "Við spilum endalaust" all released as singles. Með suð... was also certified gold in the UK.

In March 2012, Sigur Rós released "Ekki múkk", from their sixth studio album Valtari, also released in 2012. In 2013, they released their seventh album, Kveikur.

Albums

Studio albums

Compilation albums

Live albums

Remix albums

Soundtrack albums

Video albums

Extended plays

Singles

Other appearances
These songs have not appeared on official Sigur Rós releases.

Guest appearances

Compilation appearances

Soundtrack appearances

Music videos

References

External links
 Sigur Rós official website
 Sigur Rós official UK website
 
 
 

Discography
Rock music group discographies
Discographies of Icelandic artists
Alternative rock discographies